Michael P. Snyder is an American genomicist who is the Stanford B. Ascherman Professor and as of 2009, Chair of Genetics and Director of Genomics and Personalized Medicine at Stanford University, and the former Director of the Yale Center for Genomics and Proteomics. He was elected to The American Academy of Arts and Sciences in 2015. During his tenure as chair of the department at Stanford, the U.S. News & World Report has ranked Stanford University first or tied for first in Genetics, Genomics and Bioinformatics under his leadership.

Snyder has co-founded companies in genetics, genomics, and personalized medicine, including Personalis, a company that develops software to interpret genomes after sequencing; January AI, a health startup; Protometrix; Affomix; and Q Bio.

Snyder has been a principal investigator of the ENCODE project since its inception in 2003, and  co-director of the CIRM Center for Stem Cell Genomics and Director of the Center for Genome of Gene Regulation.

Snyder pioneered the use of multi-omic longitudinal profiling to track health.

Early life and education 
Snyder was born in 1955 and grew up outside of Pottstown, Pennsylvania. His father, Kermit Snyder, was an accountant and his mother, Phyllis Snyder, was an elementary school teacher. Snyder attended Owen J Roberts High school in Pottstown. He received a BA in chemistry and biology from the University of Rochester, NY on a scholarship. He went on to receive a PhD in biology from the California Institute of Technology, where he trained in the laboratory of Norman Davidson. Snyder completed his postdoctoral training at Stanford University School of Medicine in the laboratory of Ronald W. Davis. There he was involved in several projects including establishment of successful cloning of genes using antibodies (lambagt11;) (4).

Career 
Snyder was hired by Yale University in 1986 as an Assistant Professor in the Department of Biology, and was granted tenure in 1994. In 1998, the Department of Biology split into two departments, one focused on ecology and one on molecular biology. Snyder served as chair of the new Molecular, Cellular and Developmental Biology (MCDB) department from 1998-2004. His laboratory worked on chromosome segregation and cell polarity for which he discovered a number of important genes involved in these processes.

His laboratory proposed the first models by which eucaryotes select sites of cell growth.

Snyder was also the Director for the Center for Genomics and Proteomics at Yale University (2002-2009), Elected to the Genetics Society of America Board of Directors (2006-2009), Elected President of US HUPO (2006- 2008), PI, Center of Excellence in the Genome Sciences (CEGS)(2001-2011), President, Human Proteome Organization (HUPO)(2017-2018), PI, NIH Training Grant in Genomics and Proteomics (2004-2022).

In 2009, Snyder moved to Stanford University to Chair the Genetics Department and to direct the Center for Genomics and Personalized Medicine. Snyder has been Principal Investigator of Center of Excellence in the Genome Sciences (CEGS) (2001–2011), NIH Training Grants in Genomics and Proteomics (first at Yale, now at Stanford) (2004–present), and is coDirector of the CIRM Center for Stem Cell Genomics and Director for the Center for Genome of Gene Regulation. Snyder was elected and has served as President of US Human Proteome Organization (2006–2008) and the international Human Proteome Organization (2017-2018). He currently leads the National Institutes of Health's Encyclopedia of DNA Elements (Encode)'s Production Center for Mapping Regulatory Regions of the Human Genome.

Snyder has co-founded biotechnology companies, including Personalis, SensOmics, Qbio, January AI, Filtricine, Mirvie, Protos, Protometrix (now part of Thermo Fisher Scientific), and Affomix (now part of Illumina).

Research
Snyder has made contributions to medicine, genomics and biotechnology. To support their research, Snyder’s laboratory has invented a number of novel systems-wide and genomics technologies. Snyder's laboratory at Yale initially focused on studying the genome of the yeast Saccharomyces cerevisiae, a eukaryote model organism commonly used in genetics and molecular biology. Later, the lab began to use the same techniques to look at the human genome.

In 2003, the  Encyclopedia of DNA Elements (ENCODE) project was launched by the US National Human Genome Research Institute (NHGRI), with the goal of identifying all functional elements in the human genome. He has been a Principal Investigator in the ENCODE project since its inception in 2003 and his lab has contributed a large number of data sets. These data contributed to the discovery that there are many more transcription factor binding sites than originally thought(13), and that twice as much of the human genome is transcribed into mature RNA.

The Snyder laboratory then showed that transcription factor binding sites vary greatly among people and closely related species, showing that much of the diversity between individuals and closely related species happens at the level of gene regulation, rather than changes in the genes themselves.

Snyder broadened his lab's genomics research to include the fields of proteomics, transcriptomics, and metabolomics. After his 2009 move to Stanford, Snyder also began to focus on using these omics technologies to monitor human health. In 2012, the lab published the first deep longitudinal profiling of a single person using multi-omics technologies, producing a data set colloquially known as the Snyderome. This research approach later expanded to over 100 people and included data generated by wearable biosensors.

Libraries and arrays
Snyder’s laboratory set up the first large scale systems project to study all yeast genes and proteins simultaneously using a transposon tagging strategy to analyze gene expression, protein localization, and gene disruption. This was the first large-scale systems analysis of genes and proteins in any organism. The libraries and approaches were released publicly and now in use by laboratories worldwide.

Beyond the genome, the Snyder lab was also the first to set up protein and proteome microarrays for the large-scale characterization of protein function and antibody reactivity. They demonstrated many novel biological activities of protein kinases and other yeast proteins and showed they can be useful for autoantibody profiling.

Their laboratory constructed the first human chromosome array (15) and later the first whole genome array  to map transcription factor binding sites and novel transcribed regions of the genome.

In collaboration with Dr. Patrick Brown’s laboratory, the Snyder laboratory developed ChIP-chip to carry out the first genome wide mapping of transcription factor binding sites. Initially established for yeast, they later applied the methods to humans.

Next-generation sequencing
The ChIP-chip technique for mapping of transcription factor binding sites was ultimately morphed into ChIP-seq, in order to take advantage of DNA sequencing rather than using DNA microarrays.(12) The ChIP-seq method was foundational for multiple multicenter consortia projects including the Encyclopedia of DNA Elements project (ENCODE; (14)). They later invented RNA-seq to better map transcriptomes, both protein coding and noncoding (17,18). 
	
With the advent of high throughput DNA sequencing technologies,  Snyder's laboratory was the first to sequence an organism using such technology. Snyder's Laboratory sequenced the human pathogen Acinetobacter baumannii and invented paired end sequencing using new high throughput sequencing technologies (20), using this to demonstrate that there were ten times as much structural variation (SV) in the human genome than previously realized and that most SV deletions and insertions were due to nonhomologous recombination, an unexpected discovery at the time, since most SVs were proposed to be due to homologous recombination events.

Beyond the genome, the Snyder laboratory was also the first to set up protein and proteome microarrays for the large-scale characterization of protein function and antibody reactivity.) They demonstrated many novel biological activities of protein kinases and other yeast proteins and showed they can be useful for autoantibody profiling.

Omics profiling and data driven medicine
Using the same in-depth omics approaches he applied to yeast, upon his move to Stanford in 2009, Snyder began to apply systems-wide analysis to human health (29). The Snyder laboratory carried out the first deep longitudinal profiling of one person using multi-'omics technologies genomics, transcriptomics, proteomics, metabolomics, etc.). This deep profiling used genomics for the first time to predict disease risk and follow disease onset at a level not previously achieved. Highlighted in Cell journal's 40th anniversary issue, Snyder presents "how personalized medicine may be applied to individuals over long time frames, analyzing transcription, metabolite, and cytokine fluctuations through periods of health and disease alongside fully sequenced genomes". This approach of collecting longitudinal deep data on humans is now being applied by many groups worldwide. The Snyder lab has demonstrated that self-tracking using wearable biosensors can be used for monitoring health and illness. Together these studies demonstrate the power of using longitudinal tracking and big data to manage human health.

Selected publications
 Alavi, Arash, et al. . Nature medicine 2021 Nov 29:1-0.
 Bahmani, Amir, et al. 
 Mishra, Tejaswini, et al. 
 Robertson G, Hirst M, Bainbridge M, Bilenky M, Zhao Y, Zeng T, Euskirchen G, Bernier B, Varhol R, Delaney A, Thiessen N, …, Snyder M and Jones S. . Nat Methods. 2007;4:651-7.
 Horak, Christine E., et al. . Proceedings of the National Academy of Sciences 99.5 (2002): 2924-2929.
 The ENCODE Project Consortium. . Nature. 2012. 489(7414): 57-74.
 Wang Z, Gerstein M, Snyder M. . Nat Rev Genet. 2009 Jan;10(1):57-63. PMID 19015660.
 Hudson ME, Pozdnyakova I, Haines K, Mor G, Snyder M. . Proc Natl Acad Sci USA. 2007;104: 17494-9.
 Kasowski M, Grubert F, Heffelfinger C, Hariharan M, Asabere A, Waszak SM, Habegger L, Rozowsky J, Shi M, Urban AE, … Weissman SM, Gerstein MB, Korbel JO, Snyder M. . Science. 2010. 328(5975): 232-5. Epub 2010. PMID 20299548.
 Borneman AR, Gianoulis TA, Zhang ZD, Yu H, Rozowsky J, Seringhaus MR, Wang LY, Gerstein M, Snyder M. . Science. 2007;317: 815-19.
 Chen R, Mias GI, Li-Pook-Than J, Jiang L, … Snyder M. . Cell. 2012;148:1293-307.
 Li X, Dunn J, Salins D, Zhou G, Zhou W, Schüssler-Fiorenza Rose SM, Perelman D, Colbert E, Runge R, Rego S, Sonecha R, Datta S, McLaughlin T, Snyder M. . 2017 Jan 12;15(1):e2001402. doi: 10.1371/journal.pbio.2001402. PMID 28081144

Book
 Genomics and Personalized Medicine: What Everyone Needs to Know Oxford University Press (2016) .

Awards and honors
Pew Scholars (1987)
Lewis B Cullman named chair, Yale (1996)
Burroughs Wellcome Scholar Award (2000)
Connecticut Medal of Science (2007)
Stanford B. Ascherman named chair, Stanford (2011)
Member of the American Academy of Sciences (elected 2015)
George W. Beadle Award, Genetics Society of America (2019)

References 

American geneticists
1955 births
Stanford University School of Medicine faculty
California Institute of Technology alumni
20th-century American inventors
21st-century American inventors
Jewish American scientists
Members of the United States National Academy of Sciences
Biotechnologists
21st-century American Jews
Living people